The 2000 NAIA Football Championship Series concluded on December 16, 2000 with the championship game played at Jim Carroll Stadium in Savannah, Tennessee.  The game featured the same two teams that met for the prior season's title, but this time the outcome was flipped.  This game was won by the Georgetown Tigers over the Northwestern Oklahoma State Rangers by a score of 20–0.

Tournament bracket

  * denotes OT.

See also
 2000 NAIA football rankings

References

 
NAIA Football National Championship
Northwestern Oklahoma State Rangers football
Georgetown Tigers football
December 2000 sports events in the United States
NAIA football